Pozzo d'Adda is a comune (municipality) in the Province of Milan in the Italian region Lombardy, located about  northeast of Milan.

Pozzo d'Adda borders the following municipalities: Grezzago, Trezzano Rosa, Basiano, Vaprio d'Adda, Masate, Inzago, Cassano d'Adda.

Demographic evolution

References

External links
 web.tiscalinet.it/comunepozzo

Cities and towns in Lombardy